Nasrin Husseini is an Afghan-born Canadian advocate of refugees, veterinary researcher, and a food activist, working to remake the food system. Her research focuses on advancing animal health through breeding and improving the productivity of the food derived from farm animals. In 2021, she was part of the 100 Women BBC list, which includes the most inspiring and influential women in the world.

Biography 

Nasrin Husseini was born in Afghanistan and spent her childhood as a refugee in Iran. After the fall of the Taliban, she moved back to Afghanistan in 2004. She attended Kabul University's veterinary medicine program, and was in the second class of women to graduate from the program in 2010.

In 2010, she relocated to Toronto, Canada as a refugee due to discrimination she experienced as an educated woman in Afghanistan, and she enrolled at University of Guelph. Her family joined her in Canada in 2018. She received a master of science degree in immunology in 2020; her thesis advisor was Bonnie A. Mallard and was titled Resilience of High Immune Responder Beef Cattle in the Context of Climate Change (2020). After graduation Husseini works at University of Guelph as a veterinary researcher in the immunology lab.

Husseini works as a volunteer for Hazara Humanitarian Services in Brampton, assisting the Hazara people from Afghanistan in settling in Canada; and volunteers with Bookies Youth Program, promoting Afghani literacy and storytelling for children.

See also 

 List of women climate scientists and activists

References

External links 
 Profile at Arrell Food Institute at University of Guelph
 

Living people
Date of birth missing (living people)
Afghan emigrants to Canada
Kabul University alumni
University of Guelph alumni
BBC 100 Women
Women environmentalists
Afghan women activists
Child refugees
Afghan refugees
Year of birth missing (living people)
Canadian Sunni Muslims